It Only Happens to Others is a 1971 drama film written and directed by Nadine Trintignant. The film was made in the wake of the death of Nadine and Jean-Louis Trintignant's daughter Pauline in 1969.

Cast
 Catherine Deneuve as Catherine
 Marcello Mastroianni as Marcello
 Serge Marquand as Catherine's brother
 Dominique Labourier as Marguerite
 Danièle Lebrun as Sophie
 Catherine Allégret as mother in park
 Marc Eyraud
 Rosa Chiara Magrini as Marcello's sister
 Benoît Ferreux as little girl
 Marie Trintignant
 Catherine Hiegel
 Edouard Niermans as young man
 Andrée Damant as nurse

References

External links
 
 
 

1971 films
1971 drama films
1970s French films
1970s French-language films
1970s Italian films
Films about grieving
Films directed by Nadine Trintignant
French drama films
French-language Italian films
Italian drama films